The 2021–22 season is FCSB's 74rd season since its founding in 1947.

Previous season positions

Season overview

Players

First team squad

Transfers

In

Out

Overall transfer activity

Expenditure
Summer:  €0,650,000

Winter: €0,330,000

Total:  €0,980,000

Income
Summer:  €3,600,000

Winter: €0,000,000

Total:  €3,600,000

Net Totals
Summer:  €2,950,000 

Winter: €0,330,000

Total:  €2,620,000

Friendly matches

Competitions

Overview

Liga I

Regular season

Table

Results summary

Position by round

Results

Championship round

Table

Results summary

Position by round

Matches

Cupa României

UEFA Europa Conference League

Second qualifying rounds

Statistics

Goalscorers

Goal minutes

Last updated: 22 May 2022 (UTC) 
Source: FCSB

Clean sheets

Disciplinary record

Attendances

1Impact of the COVID-19 pandemic on association football

See also

 2021–22 Cupa României
 2021–22 Liga I
 2021–22 UEFA Europa Conference League

Notes and references

FC Steaua București seasons
Steaua
Steaua București